Night Visions is a 2012 album by Imagine Dragons.

Night Visions may also refer to:

 Night Visions (book series), a horror fiction series
 Night Visions (film), a 1990 television film directed by Wes Craven
 Night Visions (film festival), a biannual film festival held in Helsinki, Finland
 Night Visions (TV series), a 2001 American horror anthology series
 Night Visions Tour, the Imagine Dragons tour promoting the album
 Night Visions Live, a 2014 live album by Imagine Dragons
 Night visions of Zechariah in the Book of Zechariah

See also
 Night Vision (disambiguation)